The Ukrainian Cup 2002–03 was the 12th annual edition of Ukraine's football knockout competition, known as the Ukrainian Cup. The winner of this competition was Dynamo Kyiv, beating rivals Shakhtar Donetsk in the final.

Round and draw dates
All draws held at FFU headquarters (Building of Football) in Kyiv unless stated otherwise.

Competition Schedule

First round

Second round

Third Round (1/8)

Quarterfinals 

|}

Semifinals 

|}

Final 

Ukrainian Cup seasons
Cup
Ukrainian Cup